Pulleys Mill is an unincorporated community in Williamson County, Illinois. It is generally located north of Goreville, near the western terminus of Interstate 24 at Interstate 57.

The area was named after Barton S. Pulley, and had a post office from October 28, 1864, to July 14, 1905. Mail is now routed through the nearby town of Goreville.

References 

Unincorporated communities in Illinois
Unincorporated communities in Williamson County, Illinois
Populated places established in 1864